Amadeu Amaral (full name Amadeu Ataliba Arruda Amaral Leite Penteado) was a Brazilian poet, folklorist, philologist and essayist. He was born in Capivari on November 6, 1875, and died in São Paulo on October 24, 1929.

He spent his early years in Capivari and moved to São Paulo at the age of 11. He became a journalist, working at Correio Paulistano and O Estado de Sao Paulo. In 1922 he moved to Rio for a new role at Gazeta de Notícias. From Rio, he sent a regular column "Bilhes do Rio" to O Estado de Sao Paulo. Returning to São Paulo, he held positions in public administration.

Amaral was largely self-taught, as he did not complete his secondary education. He dedicated himself to folk studies and to the study of regional dialects. In Brazil, he was the first to study a regional dialect scientifically. Dialect caipira, published in 1920, was a study of the language of the São Paulo caipira in the Paraíba River valley area, analyzing its forms and scrutinizing its vocabulary. His poetry is classified as "post-Parnassian", and was praised by peers such as Guilherme de Almeida.

He was the second occupant of Chair 15 of the Brazilian Academy. He was elected on August 7, 1919, in succession to Olavo Bilac, and received by academic Carlos Magalhães de Azeredo on November 14, 1919.

References

1875 births
1929 deaths
Brazilian essayists
Brazilian folklorists
Brazilian philologists
Brazilian poets
Brazilian writers